The 2018 Mongolian Premier League (also known as the Khurkhree National Premier League) is the 50th edition of the top-tier football league in Mongolia. Erchim comes into the season as defending champions of the 2017 season.

Arvis FC and Gepro FC entered as the two promoted teams from the Mongolian 1st League while Khoromkhon FC and Ulaanbaataryn Unaganuud FC were relegated.

The season started on 28 April 2018.

Clubs and locations

League table

See also
2018 Mongolia Cup

References

Mongolia Premier League seasons
2018 in Mongolian sport
Mongolia